Kate Moira Ryan is an American playwright.

Among the plays Ryan has worked on are Leaving Queens; The Beebo Brinker Chronicles, an adaptation of three books by Ann Bannon;  Caveweller; and Bass for Picasso.

Ryan was the co-writer of comedian Judy Gold's one-woman show, 25 Questions for a Jewish Mother.  It is based on a series of interviews with more than 50 Jewish mothers in the United States.  Their stories are interspersed with anecdotes about Gold's own mother and her life as a lesbian mother of two sons.

References

American dramatists and playwrights
Living people
American lesbian writers
American LGBT dramatists and playwrights
American women dramatists and playwrights
Year of birth missing (living people)
21st-century American women writers